Forgotton Anne is an adventure-platform game developed by ThroughLine Games and published by Square Enix Collective. The game uses a hand-drawn anime aesthetic style and an orchestral score performed by the Copenhagen Philharmonic Orchestra and was released on May 15, 2018 on Microsoft Windows, Xbox One, and PlayStation 4. The game was released for macOS on June 21, 2018, Nintendo Switch on November 9, 2018, iOS on June 26, 2019, and Android on December 18, 2019.

Plot
Forgotton Anne takes place in a fictional world called Forgotten Lands, a magical parallel universe where lost objects — everything from missing socks to discarded lamps — come to life, hoping one day that they might be remembered again and returned to the real world. The player controls Anne, an Enforcer who keeps order in the Forgotten Lands, who sets out to extinguish a rebellion that could prevent her master, Bonku, and herself from returning to the human world.

Reception

According to review aggregator Metacritic, Forgotton Anne has received "generally favorable reviews" across Windows, PlayStation 4, and Xbox One.

The game was nominated for "Original Song" with "Forgotten Anne," written by Randi Laubek, at the 9th Hollywood Music in Media Awards, for "Best Storytelling" at the 2018 Golden Joystick Awards, for "Outstanding Achievement in Original Music Composition" at the D.I.C.E. Awards, for "Excellence in Visual Art" at the Independent Games Festival Awards, for "Music of the Year" and "Best Music for an Indie Game" at the 2019 G.A.N.G. Awards, for "Adventure Game", "Best Art Direction", and "Best Writing" at the 2019 Webby Awards, for "Best Visual Art", "Best Narrative", and "Best Original IP" at the Develop:Star Awards, and for "Best Storytelling" at the Pocket Gamer Mobile Games Awards.

References

External links

Developer website

2018 video games
Adventure games
Fantasy video games
Indie video games
IOS games
MacOS games
Nintendo Switch games
Platform games
PlayStation 4 games
Square Enix games
Video games developed in Denmark
Video games featuring female protagonists
Windows games
Xbox One games